The 2003 Troy State Trojans football team represented Troy State University—now known as Troy University—as an independent during the 2003 NCAA Division I-A football season. Led by 13th-year head coach Larry Blakeney, the Trojans compiled a record of 6–6. Troy State played home games at Movie Gallery Stadium in Troy, Alabama.

On  September 27, Troy had one of biggest wins in the program's history, defeating Marshall, 33–24, in front of a record crowd of 26,000. Marshall finished the previous season as the No. 24-ranked team in the AP Poll upset No. 6 Kansas State the week before. After the game, students and fans in attendance rushed the field and tore down the goal posts.

Schedule

References

Troy State
Troy Trojans football seasons
Troy State Trojans football